Percival Norman Barton (9 September 1888 – 6 December 1912) was a former Australian rules footballer who played with Richmond in the Victorian Football League (VFL). He died aged 24 in a motor cycle accident in Melbourne.

Notes

External links 

1888 births
1912 deaths
Australian rules footballers from Victoria (Australia)
Richmond Football Club players
Motorcycle road incident deaths
Road incident deaths in Victoria (Australia)